The 1934 Tasmanian state election was held on 9 June 1934.

Retiring Members

Labor
Jens Jensen MHA (Wilmot)

Nationalist
John McPhee MHA (Denison)

House of Assembly
Sitting members are shown in bold text. Tickets that elected at least one MHA are highlighted in the relevant colour. Successful candidates are indicated by an asterisk (*).

Bass
Six seats were up for election. The Labor Party was defending two seats. The Nationalist Party was defending four seats.

Darwin
Six seats were up for election. The Labor Party was defending two seats. The Nationalist Party was defending four seats.

Denison
Six seats were up for election. The Labor Party was defending two seats. The Nationalist Party was defending four seats.

Franklin
Six seats were up for election. The Labor Party was defending two seats. The Nationalist Party was defending three seats, although independent MHA Benjamin Watkins had joined the Nationalists and was running on their ticket.

Wilmot
Six seats were up for election. The Labor Party was defending two seats. The Nationalist Party was defending four seats.

See also
 Members of the Tasmanian House of Assembly, 1931–1934
 Members of the Tasmanian House of Assembly, 1934–1937

References
Tasmanian Parliamentary Library

Candidates for Tasmanian state elections